Les Foudres d'Hypsis is volume twelve in the French comic book (or bande dessinée) science fiction series Valérian and Laureline created by writer Pierre Christin and artist Jean-Claude Mézières.

Synopsis
Inverloch Castle, the morning after the events of The Ghosts of Inverloch.  Meeting for breakfast, Valérian, Laureline, the Chief, Lord and Lady Seal, the Shingouz, Ralph and Albert consider their next move.  Lord Seal reports that worldwide nuclear defence systems continue to be disturbed as more and more mysterious objects from Hypsis are found.  Albert produces the secret documents and other papers he has carried from France to Inverloch – knowing that the 1986 catastrophe occurred at the Arctic Circle, he has used his maritime contacts to provide a list of vessels that may have been involved.  The Chief reveals that the devices of Hypsis have also done their work on Galaxity.  Lord Seal reveals that a vessel is due to meet them at Kenchmoor Cove.  Arriving at the cove, they are met by Lieutenant Commander Merrywhistle of the weather ship HMS Crosswinds.  Boarding his ship they begin their voyage.

Valérian's sleep is frequently wracked by nightmares – images of the flood that engulfed the Earth in 1986 and of Galaxity disappearing into space-time.  Looking in on the chief Valérian and Laureline are disturbed to see him apparently mesmerized by one of the Hypsis' devices.  Meeting with Albert and Merryweather, they consider the ships that are known to be in the Arctic.  Albert has narrowed the possibilities down to two cargo ships, a whaler and a schooner.

Several days later and they have intercepted and ruled out the two cargo ships and the whaler.  Suddenly, Ralph, who has been spending most of his spare time in the ocean, returns to the Crosswinds to report that he may have some information.  Checking the pictures of the last ship that they seek – the schooner Hvexdet – Ralph believes that this is the ship his contacts, the orcas that live in the Arctic Ocean, have told him about.  He returns, accompanied by Valérian, to speak to them again.  The orcas tell Ralph that the ship does not seem to be human to them and that they last saw it near Baffin Bay.

Some time later, the Crosswinds has come upon the Hvexdet lying idle amid a group of icebergs.  Merrywhistle orders his ship to ram the Hvexdet.  Just as the prow of Crosswinds is about to make contact with the hull of the Hvexdet, the Hvexdet glows with a bright, alien energy and launches from the ocean into space.  This is what the Chief has been counting on – Ralph will be able to use his advanced mathematical abilities to track the Hvexdet back to Hypsis.  Distracted by the Hvexdet'''s unexpected maneuver, the Crosswinds strikes an iceberg and begins to sink.  Merryweather orders the passengers and crew to abandon ship and they make for the lifeboats.  Merryweather and his crew make contact with two rescue ships and head off to rendezvous with them but Valérian and the others stay out on the ocean near the sinking Crosswinds.  Using his communicator, Valérian calls Lord Seal who, using the spatio-temporal jump, brings Valérian and Laureline's astroship to hover just above their lifeboat.  Boarding the astroship, they take off in pursuit of the Hvexdet.

The Hvexdet careers through space-time, making seemingly random jumps, pursued, thanks to Ralph's abilities, by the astroship.  Valérian proposes that they use Ralph's abilities to their greatest extent by putting him into direct phase with the astroship itself and attempting to predict where the Hvexdet will jump to before it can make the jump itself.  With Ralph plugged in they make a series of jumps all in quick succession.  Just as they are about to make the final jump to Hypsis, the Chief is assailed with doubt as to whether they are doing the right thing while Valérian is tortured once more by visions of Galaxity disappearing. Laureline, for her part, does not come from Galaxity and, fed up with their indecision, activates the jump herself and they emerge suddenly on Hypsis.  The Hvexdet is ahead of them and it crashes at the foot of an immense tower.

Bringing the astroship into land, Valérian and Laureline make for the wreckage of the Hvexdet.  Examining the ship, which appears to have been crewed by androids, they find the hold loaded with nuclear charges – enough to cause the catastrophe that melted the icecaps in 1986.  The intervention by the passengers and crew of the Crosswinds means that the catastrophe will not now take place.  Exploring the nearby tower, they are stopped by two sentries who tell them that only those summoned for non payment of taxes are allowed into the tower.  The Hvexdet does not belong to the tower it crashed beside.  A spot of negotiation by the Shingouz eventually yields the location of the tower that sent it.  Gathering up the others, the party head for the tower.

Arriving at the location they were given, they are surprised to find the tower is run down and neglected.  Reaching the top, they are greeted by the three Lords of Hypsis who are behind the Hvexdet and the sabotage of Earth's nuclear defence capability. They include a huge man dressed in a trilby hat and trenchcoat in the manner of a gruff detective from a film noir, his hippy son and a talking slot machine which the first man is always hitting.

It dawns on Albert and Lord Seal that these strange people are in fact the Holy Trinity – the perichoresis of God, the Son and the Holy Spirit.

God explains that his family has owned the Earth since its creation and has been intervening in its development, hoping to bring it forward to a point where it can return wealth to Hypsis.  Other planets are owned by the other towers.  The Hypsis have returned to Earth again – in the 20th century in the form of the devices that have sabotaged the Earth's defences and in the 28th century in the form of a small silver ball given to the Chief by one of his spatio-temporal agents.  This has wiped out Galaxity.  The Trinity have had to wipe out Galaxity because of the complaints they are getting from the other towers – Galaxity's imperialist tendencies have impacted on the other worlds that send tribute back to Hypsis.  At this point, Albert interrupts, stating that if they proceed with their plan to cause a cataclysm in 1986 they will only precipitate the events that led to Galaxity's foundation.  He points out that history is now on a different track.  Lord Seal offers to intercede and to arrange for some tribute to revert to Hypsis, an arrangement that may allow the Trinity to restore their lost prestige.  The Chief asks God if he can be returned to Galaxity, even though it has gone.  Valérian wishes to go with him, to Laureline's horror.  However, the Shingouz, seeing how upset Laureline is, strike a deal with God to keep the astroship for Valérian and Laureline so that they can continue their adventures together.

Some time later, back at Inverloch, Valérian ponders the Galaxity he has lost as he contemplates his astroship, before Laureline prompts him into joining her, Albert and the Seals in a quiet game of croquet.

Main characters
 Valérian, a spatio-temporal agent from Galaxity, future capital of Earth, in the 28th century
 Laureline, originally from France in the 11th century, now a spatio-temporal agent of Galaxity in the 28th century
 Mr Albert, Galaxity's contact in 20th century Earth
 Lord Basil Seal, former Spitfire pilot and chair of the UK Joint Intelligence Committee
 Lady Charlotte Seal (née MacCullough), wife of Lord Seal and heir to the Clan MacCullough, owners of Inverloch Castle
 The Chief of the Spatio-Temporal Service
 The Shingouz, a group of three aliens who trade in information
 Ralph, a Glapum'tien, an aquatic species of brilliant mathematicians capable of instantaneously calculating the trajectory of any object. 
 Lieutenant Commander Patrick Fitzgerald Merrywhistle of the weather ship HMS Crosswinds.
 James, butler to Lord and Lady Seal at Inverloch Castle
 The Trinity of Hypsis – God, the Son and the Holy Spirit

Settings
 Earth, year 1986:
 Scotland, Inverloch Castle. See entry for The Ghosts of Inverloch for more detailed description. Kenchmoor, where Lady Seal goes riding, leads to Kenchmoor Cove where Valérian and the others rendezvous with Lieutenant Commander Merrywhistle of the Crosswinds.
 The Arctic Ocean. The Crosswinds finds the Hvexdet close to Baffin Bay.
 The Climphus Cluster. A dense asteroid field where the Hvexdet attempts to shake off Valérian's pursuit.
 The planet Hypsis. This mysterious planet moves from location to location at random, making hard to find. At the time that Valérian and Laureline reach it is acting as the fourth moon of the gas giant Anoubil, a planet in Zuben-El-Akrab, a star in the constellation of Libra. The sky is coloured orange and the ground is rocky but fertile. The Lords of Hypsis live in great towers dotted around the surface. They are visited by people bringing tribute from the worlds they own. The Lords who own the Solar System live in a rusting and crumbling tower perched on top of a finger of rock.

Notes
 This was the last Valérian story to be serialised in Pilote magazine.
 This is one of the most important albums in the series – with new Valérian stories still being published by the mid-1980s, Mézières and Christin had to find a way to reconcile the real 1986 with the fictional one they had first depicted in 1968 in The City of Shifting Waters in which the world had been ravaged by a nuclear accident at the North Pole that had destroyed most of the world's cities. By having Valérian prevent the accident from happening, his home, Galaxity, is wiped from the timeline in a temporal paradox changing the basic framework of the series – with no home to return to and no Galaxity to issue them with orders, Valérian and Laureline have to resort to acting as freelance agents offering their services to whoever can pay them.
 This album brings to a conclusion the plot thread set up in Welcome to Alflolol and Ambassador of the Shadows that Galaxity, far from being the benign utopia it claims to be, is in fact corrupt and imperialistic.
 God's appearance is based on that of Harry Quinlan, the character played by Orson Welles in the 1958 film Touch of Evil''.

1985 graphic novels
Valérian and Laureline